Moptop was a Brazilian alternative rock band from Rio de Janeiro, popular throughout the mid- to late 2000s. Initially known as DeLux, they were formed in 2003 and comprised vocalist/lead guitarist Gabriel Marques, second guitarist Rodrigo Curi, bassist Daniel Campos and drummer Mário Mamede. Strongly influenced by acts such as The Strokes (to whom they were frequently compared), The Beatles, Franz Ferdinand, Ramones and Los Hermanos, they began playing in small venues with songs in English; by the time of the release of their first demo, Moonrock, in 2005, they changed their name to "Moptop" in a reference to the famous hairstyle worn by The Beatles in the 1960s.

In 2006 they signed to Universal Music Group for the release of their debut full-length album, the self-titled Moptop, which spawned the hit singles "O Rock Acabou" and "Sempre Igual", included in the soundtrack of the 14th season of the long-running soap opera Malhação. The album's success led them to open shows by bands such as Oasis, Interpol, The Magic Numbers and The Bravery throughout the year. In 2007 they took part in a show organized by MTV Brasil alongside NX Zero, Fresno, Hateen and Forfun; a live album of the performance would be released soon after. The same year, they were nominated for the MTV Video Music Brazil award, in the "Best New Act" category (after winning it two years prior in the "Best Website" category), and also for a Multishow Brazilian Music Award in the "Revelation Artist" category.

2008 saw the release of the band's second and ultimately final album, Como se Comportar; produced by British producer Paul Ralphes, who previously worked with Sandy & Junior, Gabriel Marques described its sonority as "heavily influenced by the soundtracks of Ennio Morricone and films by Quentin Tarantino". In 2011 Marques announced that he would be putting the band on hold for an indeterminate amount of time, and in 2013 he eventually confirmed that Moptop officially ceased their activities. Drummer Mário Mamede would later form the group Herzegovina in 2017, alongside former members of Planet Hemp and Polara.

Discography

Demo albums 
 (2005) Moonrock

Studio albums
 (2006) Moptop
 (2008) Como se Comportar

References

External links
 Official website
 Moptop on Myspace

Musical groups established in 2003
Musical groups disestablished in 2013
2003 establishments in Brazil
2013 disestablishments in Brazil
Musical groups from Rio de Janeiro (city)
Brazilian alternative rock groups
Brazilian pop rock music groups
Brazilian indie rock groups
Pop punk groups
Musical quartets